was a Japanese video game developer and publisher headquartered in Kita, Osaka. In the past they had also manufactured and sold yachts.

The main video game brand of the company was Nichibutsu (日物、ニチブツ), with adult video games (mainly strip mahjong arcade games) coming under the Sphinx (スフィンクス) brand. The company used a horned owl for its official logo.

In March 2014, Nihon Bussan sold its video game library to Hamster Corporation due to the decision of original founder Sueharu Torii to retire. The company was disbanded on December 15, 2015.

History

The company's founder Sueharu Torii established Nihon Bussan in October 1970 in Kita-ku, Osaka. They begin their activities by mainly selling arcade machines. In 1972, the company was incorporated as Nihon Bussan Co., Ltd with a capital of 3 million yen.

In 1976, Nihon Bussan made its debut as a manufacturer to the Amusement Machine Show and opened a Tokyo office in 1978. 1978 also saw Nihon Bussan entering the arcade game market, when they debuted with a copy of the game Breakout called Table Attacker. The same year, Nihon Bussan settled with Taito by paying a license fee to launch a copy of Space Invaders titled  Moon Base. Also in 1979, a business alliance was formed with Namco for a clone of Galaxian called Moon Alien. Originally intended as a limited release, Nihon Bussan violated the manufacturing agreement by producing the title in more units than the agreement called for and ended up paying Namco the excess of the license fee. Nihon Bussan continued to release successful titles such as Moon Cresta and Crazy Climber.

In 1983, the company developed  Jangou Night which features the industry's first undressing elements and established the genre of strip mahjong games. In 1984, Nihon Bussan developed Tube Panic,  the industry's first board game equipped with a rotation feature. From the mid-1980s, Nihon Bussan released  Terra Cresta and Cosmo Police Galivan that made use of Yamaha YM3812 FM sound.

Nihon Bussan entered the home video game market in 1983 by developing a console of their own, the My Vision, and in 1986 released their first NES title, MagMax, followed by the MSX in 1989; the same year also saw the release of the company's last mainstream arcade game, Sky Robo (Tatakae! Big Fighter in Japan) before switching to exclusively produce strip mahjong titles for that market; in 1992, the company left JAMMA after the arcade industry began showing concerns about increasingly risque material in their strip mahjong games. In 1990, Nihon Bussan released console-first titles for the PC Engine such as F1 Circus which became a major hit. During the height of the F1 Circus series, Nihon Bussan sponsored Team Lotus from 1991 to 1993; the sponsorship agreement allowed Lotus to appear as the only licensed team in the F1 Circus titles until Nichibutsu obtained a complete license from Formula One Constructors Association.

Nihon Bussan began releasing games for the Mega Drive in 1991, SNES in 1992, Sony PlayStation in 1995 and for the Sega Saturn in 1996. Some of the titles were mahjong titles, with their PC Engine game Sexy Idol Mahjong featuring strip elements from their arcade titles.

In March 2009, the company partnered with D4 Enterprise to reprint and distribute Nihon Bussan retro games for its Project EGG service.

In March 2014, Nihon Bussan sold the rights of all video games to Hamster Corporation. Hamster had approached founder Sueharu Torii for a licensing agreement of Nihon Bussan's games. Torii opted instead to sell outright the company's video game library and to retire.

Timeline

 1979 – The company's headquarters is relocated to Tenjinbashi, Kita-ku, Osaka. Their capital increases to 24 million yen. Nichibutsu U.S.A. Co., Ltd. is established in Torrance, California, USA.
 1980 –  Nichibutsu U.K. Ltd. is established in West Midlands, England, United Kingdom. Nichibutsu Kyushu Co., Ltd. is established in Hakataekiminami, Hakata-ku, Fukuoka, Fukuoka.
 1981 – Nichibutsu Europe GmbH is established in Rödermark, Offenbach, Hesse, Germany. The Nihon Bussan Co., Ltd. factory opens in Sayama, Kumiyama, Kuse, Kyoto.
 1983 – Tokyo office is moved to Nihonbashihoridome, Chuo-ku, Tokyo. Nichibutsu Sapporo Co., Ltd. is established in Nakanoshima, Toyohira-ku, Sapporo, Hokkaido. Nichibutsu Sendai Co., Ltd. is established in Uesugi, Sendai, Miyagi. Nichibutsu Hiroshima Co., Ltd. is established in Higashikasumichou, Minami-ku, Hiroshima, Hiroshima. Nichibutsu also releases their only console, My Vision.
 1984 – Capital increases to 36 million yen.
 1985 – Capital increases to 50 million yen.
 1989 – Nihon Bussan's last mainstream arcade game, Sky Robo / Tatakae! Big Fighter, is released.
 1991 – The company's Tokyo office is moved to Roppongi, Minato-ku, Tokyo. 
 1992 – Nihon Bussan withdraws from the Japan Amusement Machinery Manufacturers Association over a dispute regarding the risque content in their mahjong games.
 2001 – Nihon Bussan's last home video game, Virtual Kyoutei 21, is released.
 2005 – Nihon Bussan's last arcade game (overall), Koi Suru Cosplay Akihabara is released.
 2007 – The company ends development of video games, while continuing to oversee the rights to their games.
 2009 – Nihon Bussan joins D4 Enterprise's Project EGG, a retro game republishing/distribution service.
 2014 – Nihon Bussan sells the rights to their games to Hamster Corporation and closes the company.

List of Nihon Bussan games

Paddle game
1978 Table Attacker (copy of Breakout) 
1978 Table Attacker Guard (copy of Breakout) 
1978 Table Attacker Special (copy of Breakout) 
1978 Table Attacker Black (copy of Breakout) 
1978 Table Bonpa (copy of Circus) 
1979 Attacker Ace (copy of Breakout) 
1979 Bonpa (copy of Circus)

Shooter
1978 Moon Base (copy of Space Invaders) 
1978 Moon Base Spector (copy of Space Invaders Color version) 
1978 Moon Base Zeta
1979 Super Moon Base
1980 Moon Alien (copy of Galaxian) 
1980 Moon Alien 2
1980 Moon Cresta
1980 Moon Alpha
1980 Moon Raker
1980 Moon Quasar
1981 Moon Shuttle
1984 Seicross
1984 Tube Panic
1985 MagMax
1985 Terra Cresta
1986 UFO Robo Dangar
1986 Soldier Girl Amazon (a.k.a. Sei Senshi Amatelass)
1986 Ninja Emaki (a.k.a. Youma Ninpou Cho)
1987 Sky Fox (a.k.a. Exerizer)
1987 Terra Force
1987 Legion
1988 Formation Armed F
1989 Sky Robo (a.k.a. Tatakae! Big Fighter)
1992 Terra Cresta 2
1997 Terra Cresta 3D

Action
1980 Crazy Climber
1981 Frisky Tom
1982 Wiping (also known as "Rug Rats")
1983 Dacholer (Kick Boy)
1983 Skelagon (SF-X)
1984 Roller Jammer
1984 Dynamic Ski
1985 Cop01
1985 Galivan (also known as "Cosmo Police Galivan")
1986 Mighty Guy
1987 Booby Kids (a.k.a. Kid no HORE HORE Dai Sakusen)
1987 Samurai Assassin (a.k.a. Kozure Ōkami)
1988 Crazy Climber 2
1990 Die Hard (PC Engine version developed for Pack-In-Video Co. Ltd.)
1993 Galivan 2 (also known as "Cosmo Police Galivan 2: Arrow of Justice")
1996 Expert (PlayStation 1. Japanese Title: エキスパート)

Quiz
Hihoo! (1987)
Hihoo!2 (1987)
Quiz DE Date (1991)
Miracle Q (1991)
Kotaemon kachi (1991)
TECHNO・DOOL (1991)

Puzzle
Oh! Pyepee (1988)
Tougenkyou (1988)
Pairs (1989)
Puzzle'n Desu! (1995)

Sports
 F1 Circus

Action role-playing
 Artelius

Casino
 Kouryaku Casino Bar

Mahjong
1983 Jangō Lady
1984 Night Gal (Japan's top-grossing table arcade cabinet of October 1984 and December 1984)
1986 Second Love
1990 Mahjong Triple Wars
1991 Mahjong Vanilla Syndrome
1994 Sailor Wars

Notes

References

External links

   (archives)

Video game companies established in 1970
Video game companies disestablished in 2015
Defunct video game companies of Japan
Hamster Corporation
 
Video game development companies
Hentai companies
Mass media in Osaka
Japanese companies established in 1970
Japanese companies disestablished in 2015